The 1932 United States presidential election in Delaware took place on November 8, 1932, as part of the 1932 United States presidential election which was held throughout all contemporary 48 states. Voters chose three representatives, or electors to the Electoral College, who voted for president and vice president. 

Delaware voted for the Republican nominee, incumbent President Herbert Hoover of California, over the Democratic nominee, Governor Franklin D. Roosevelt of New York. Hoover's running mate was incumbent Vice President Charles Curtis of Kansas, while Roosevelt ran with incumbent Speaker of the House John Nance Garner of Texas.

Hoover won the state by a narrow margin of 2.44%, making Delaware 1 of the only 6 states which voted to re-elect the embattled Republican incumbent president, who was widely unpopular over his failure to adequately address the Great Depression.  

With 50.55% of the popular vote. it was his fourth strongest state in the nation after Vermont, Maine and neighboring Pennsylvania.

Hoover's victory in Delaware made it the only state below the Mason–Dixon line to vote against Roosevelt in any of his four elections.

Results

See also
 United States presidential elections in Delaware

References

Delaware
1932
1932 Delaware elections